USS Keystone State may refer to the following ships operated by the United States Navy:

, was a wooden side wheel steamer purchased by the US Navy 10 June 1861 and sold at auction 15 September 1865
, was the former sloop-of-war St. Louis renamed Keystone State on 30 November 1904
, is an auxiliary crane ship launched in 1965 and currently in service

United States Navy ship names